Abhijit Sarkar may refer to:

 Abhijit Sarkar (cricketer) (born 1996), Indian cricketer
 Abhijit Sarkar (footballer) (born 2000), Indian footballer